

United States vs France

Colombia vs North Korea

† Game delayed by one hour due to a North Korean protest after erroneous use of the South Korean flag for North Korea.

United States vs Colombia

France vs North Korea

United States vs North Korea

France vs Colombia

References

Group G
Group
Group
2012 in North Korean football
2012 in Colombian football